Live in Bloomington, September 30, 2011 is a live album by Mount Eerie, released in 2013. The album captures a live performance of songs from It Was Hot, We Stayed in the Water to Clear Moon.

Recording
The album was recorded in Bloomington, Indiana at the Russian Recording studio while opening for the band Earth. It was recorded with a three-piece band consisting of two keyboard players and Phil Elverum.

Reception

Colin Joyce of Consequence of Sound wrote that "Live In Bloomington isn't just a straight-up run through Mount Eerie's greatest hits. It functions as a compelling document of what a Phil Elverum live set can be: a complete deconstruction of one of America's greatest growing songbooks".

Tracklist

Personnel
Phil Elverum – songwriting, vocals

Production
Mike Bridavsky – recording

References

Mount Eerie albums
2013 live albums